Eros Now Quickie is a short-form video content, exclusively made for the OTT platform Eros Now. The original program from Eros Now offers short stories and short web-series. Every episode is 6–10 minutes each and a quickie show is 8–10 episodes each. Eros Now is slated to launch 50 quickies in 2020. The quickies have different genres such as fiction, to non-fiction, comedy, travel, docudramas, slice-of-life etc.

List of Quickies

See also
Eros Now
Eros International
List of original programs distributed by Eros Now
List of films released by Eros International

References

Video on demand services
Indian entertainment websites